London was a federal electoral district represented in the House of Commons of Canada from 1867 to 1968. It was located in the province of Ontario.

It consisted initially of the City of London, Ontario.

In 1914, it was redefined to exclude parts of the former township of London, which was now a part of the city.

In 1924, it was redefined as consisting of that part of the city of London lying west of and south of a line following (from the north) Adelaide Street and Oxford Street, the east side of Wolsley Barracks area, Middleton Avenue, Glasgow Street, Lorne Avenue, Burbrook Place, Dundas Street, Swinyard Street, Pine Street, Elm Street, Trafalgar Street, Adelaide Street, the south branch of the River Thames, Beverly Street, and Wellington Street south to the south boundary of the city.

Members of Parliament

This riding elected the following members of the House of Commons of Canada:

Electoral history

See also 

 List of Canadian federal electoral districts
 Past Canadian electoral districts

References

External links 
 Parliamentary website

Former federal electoral districts of Ontario